Agapanthia cynarae is a species of beetle in the family Cerambycidae. It was described by Ernst Friedrich Germar in 1817.

References

cynarae
Beetles described in 1817